Molus River may refer to:

Molus River (New Brunswick), a tributary of the Richibucto River, in Weldford Parish, New Brunswick, Canada
Molus River, New Brunswick, a community whose name is taken from the above river

See also 
 Molus (disambiguation)